Wu Liufang, born on 22 December 1994, is a retired Chinese gymnast.

Gymnastics career
Wu Liufang made the Chinese national team in 2008. At the 11th Chinese national games in September 2009, she achieved bronze for uneven bars and silver for the team event (as part of Guangdong team).

Wu participated in the 2010 Doha World Cup, where she won gold on balance beam and floor, and silver on uneven bars. She also won beam gold at the 17th Internationaux de France world cup held in Paris Bercy.

At the 2010 Chinese national championships, Wu Liufang, participating for the Guangdong team, won silver in all-round, and came 4th in uneven bars and 4th in beam.

Wu Liufang attended the 2010 World Championships in Rotterdam as the 7th reserve member of the Chinese team, and did not end up competing.

She was also named into the Chinese team for the 2011 World Artistic Gymnastics Championships in Tokyo but was replaced just before the qualifying round by teammate Huang Qiushuang.

She was the oldest member for the Chinese WAG team at the 2012 Asian Artistic Gymnastics Championships where she won the Team gold with teammates Zeng Siqi, Shang Chunsong, Luo Peiru, Li Yiting and Huang Huidan. In the individual event finals, she beat teammate Huang Huidan to win the Uneven Bars gold.

Wu Liufang retired from gymnastics in October 2013.

Competitive history

References

Chinese female artistic gymnasts
1994 births
Living people
Gymnasts from Guangxi
People from Liuzhou
21st-century Chinese women